Sianak-e Pain (also Romanized as Sīānak-e Pā’īn; also known as Seyānak-e Soflá and Sīyānak) is a village in Sofla Rural District, Zavareh District, Ardestan County, Isfahan Province, Iran. At the 2006 census, its population was 13, in 9 families.

References 

Populated places in Ardestan County